Soroush, is an Iranian name and may refer to:
First name

 Soroush Ahmadi, Iranian taekwondo competitor
 Soroush Eskandari, Iranian badminton player

 Soroush Omoumi, Iranian musician

 Soroush Rafiei, Iranian footballer
 Soroush Saeidi, Iranian footballer
 Soroush Sehhat, Iranian director, screenwriter and actor
Last name
 Abdolkarim Soroush, Iranian philosopher and writer
 Abolfazl Soroush, Iranian physician and reformist politician
 Bahram Soroush, Iranian activist
 Tajuden Soroush, Afghan journalist

Others

 Soroush, publishing center of the Islamic Republic of Iran Broadcasting (IRIB)
 Soroush (messenger), Iranian instant messaging application
 Soroush Cinema (formerly known as "Moulin Rouge Cinema"), a cinema in Tehran, Iran

Persian masculine given names
Persian-language surnames